Keld Hansen (born 9 June 1962) is a Danish sports shooter. He competed in the men's trap event at the 1996 Summer Olympics.

References

External links
 

1962 births
Living people
Danish male sport shooters
Olympic shooters of Denmark
Shooters at the 1996 Summer Olympics
People from Esbjerg
Sportspeople from the Region of Southern Denmark